Contemporary Christian worship may refer to:

 Present day practices in Christian worship generally
 Contemporary worship, a form of Christian worship 
 Contemporary worship music, a subgenre of contemporary Christian music

See also
 Christian praise and worship (disambiguation)